University of Dallas station is DART Light Rail station in Irving, Texas. The station opened in July 2012 and serves the adjacent University of Dallas. The station also has an above-ground Bus Plaza for rail passengers to transfer to/from their bus routes.

References

External links 
Dallas Area Rapid Transit - University of Dallas Station

Dallas Area Rapid Transit light rail stations
Railway stations in the United States opened in 2012
Railway stations in Texas at university and college campuses
Railway stations in Dallas County, Texas
Transportation in Irving, Texas